Scottish Labour is the administrative subdivision of the Labour Party which operates in Scotland.

Scottish Labour Party may also refer to:

 Scottish Labour Party (1888), founded by Robert Cunninghame-Graham and Keir Hardie
 Scottish Labour Party (1976), a breakaway from the Labour Party (UK)
 Labour Party of Scotland, a group centred on Dundee in 1973

Political party disambiguation pages